South Victoria is a small community in the Canadian province of Nova Scotia, in Cumberland County.

References
South Victoria on Destination Nova Scotia

Communities in Cumberland County, Nova Scotia
General Service Areas in Nova Scotia